Iriwiti Lep is a small uninhabited island in the Pacific Ocean, a part of the Shefa Province of Vanuatu.

Geography
The island lies off the south coast of Efate Island.

References

Islands of Vanuatu
Shefa Province
Uninhabited islands of Vanuatu